The 2003–04 Toronto Maple Leafs season, the club's 87th season of existence and 77th as the Maple Leafs, saw the team finish in second place in the Northeast Division with a record of 45 wins, 24 losses, 10 ties and three overtime losses for 103 points. It was the highest point total in franchise history, beating out the 100 points earned by the 1999–2000 team. The Leafs defeated their provincial rivals, the Ottawa Senators, in seven games in the Conference Quarterfinals before falling to the Philadelphia Flyers four games to two in the Conference Semifinals. The Leafs did not qualify for the playoffs again until the 2012–13 season.

Offseason
On June 27, 2003, it was announced Pat Quinn would relinquish his dual roles as the team’s general manager and head coach and solely focus on coaching. John Ferguson Jr. was named the team’s new general manager on August 29.

Regular season

Season standings

Playoffs

Schedule and results

Regular season

|-  style="text-align:center; background:#fbb;"
|1||L||October 11, 2003||0–4 || style="text-align:left;"|  Montreal Canadiens (2003–04) ||0–1–0–0|| 0 || 
|- style="text-align:center;"
|2||T||October 13, 2003||2–2 OT|| style="text-align:left;"|  Washington Capitals (2003–04) ||0–1–1–0|| 1 || 
|- style="text-align:center;"
|3||T||October 16, 2003||2–2 OT|| style="text-align:left;"| @ New Jersey Devils (2003–04) ||0–1–2–0|| 2 || 
|-  style="text-align:center; background:#cfc;"
|4||W||October 18, 2003||1–0 || style="text-align:left;"| @ Montreal Canadiens (2003–04) ||1–1–2–0|| 4 || 
|-  style="text-align:center; background:#fbb;"
|5||L||October 20, 2003||2–5 || style="text-align:left;"| @ New York Islanders (2003–04) ||1–2–2–0|| 4 || 
|-  style="text-align:center; background:#cfc;"
|6||W||October 22, 2003||3–1 || style="text-align:left;"| @ Dallas Stars (2003–04) ||2–2–2–0|| 6 || 
|-  style="text-align:center; background:#cfc;"
|7||W||October 23, 2003||5–4 || style="text-align:left;"| @ Phoenix Coyotes (2003–04) ||3–2–2–0|| 8 || 
|-  style="text-align:center; background:#cfc;"
|8||W||October 25, 2003||4–1 || style="text-align:left;"|  Washington Capitals (2003–04) ||4–2–2–0|| 10 || 
|-  style="text-align:center; background:#ffc;"
|9||OTL||October 27, 2003||2–3 OT|| style="text-align:left;"|  Atlanta Thrashers (2003–04) ||4–2–2–1|| 11 || 
|-  style="text-align:center; background:#fbb;"
|10||L||October 30, 2003||3–5 || style="text-align:left;"| @ Buffalo Sabres (2003–04) ||4–3–2–1|| 11 || 
|-

|-  style="text-align:center; background:#fbb;"
|11||L||November 1, 2003 †||1–7 || style="text-align:left;"|  Philadelphia Flyers (2003–04) ||4–4–2–1|| 11 || 
|-  style="text-align:center; background:#cfc;"
|12||W||November 2, 2003||2–1 || style="text-align:left;"| @ Carolina Hurricanes (2003–04) ||5–4–2–1|| 13 || 
|-  style="text-align:center; background:#cfc;"
|13||W||November 4, 2003||4–2 || style="text-align:left;"|  Pittsburgh Penguins (2003–04) ||6–4–2–1|| 15 || 
|- style="text-align:center;"
|14||T||November 7, 2003||1–1 OT|| style="text-align:left;"| @ New Jersey Devils (2003–04) ||6–4–3–1|| 16 || 
|-  style="text-align:center; background:#cfc;"
|15||W||November 8, 2003||4–1 || style="text-align:left;"|  Edmonton Oilers (2003–04) ||7–4–3–1|| 18 || 
|-  style="text-align:center; background:#fbb;"
|16||L||November 12, 2003||1–5 || style="text-align:left;"| @ Mighty Ducks of Anaheim (2003–04) ||7–5–3–1|| 18 || 
|- style="text-align:center;"
|17||T||November 13, 2003||4–4 OT|| style="text-align:left;"| @ Los Angeles Kings (2003–04) ||7–5–4–1|| 19 || 
|- style="text-align:center;"
|18||T||November 15, 2003||2–2 OT|| style="text-align:left;"| @ San Jose Sharks (2003–04) ||7–5–5–1|| 20 || 
|-  style="text-align:center; background:#ffc;"
|19||OTL||November 18, 2003||2–3 OT|| style="text-align:left;"| @ Calgary Flames (2003–04) ||7–5–5–2|| 21 || 
|-  style="text-align:center; background:#fbb;"
|20||L||November 20, 2003||2–3 || style="text-align:left;"| @ Edmonton Oilers (2003–04) ||7–6–5–2|| 21 || 
|-  style="text-align:center; background:#cfc;"
|21||W||November 22, 2003||5–3 || style="text-align:left;"| @ Vancouver Canucks (2003–04) ||8–6–5–2|| 23 || 
|-  style="text-align:center; background:#cfc;"
|22||W||November 24, 2003||2–1 || style="text-align:left;"|  Vancouver Canucks (2003–04) ||9–6–5–2|| 25 || 
|-  style="text-align:center; background:#cfc;"
|23||W||November 27, 2003||3–1 || style="text-align:left;"| @ Atlanta Thrashers (2003–04) ||10–6–5–2|| 27 || 
|-  style="text-align:center; background:#cfc;"
|24||W||November 29, 2003||2–1 || style="text-align:left;"| @ Ottawa Senators (2003–04) ||11–6–5–2|| 29 || 
|-  style="text-align:center; background:#cfc;"
|25||W||November 30, 2003||4–2 || style="text-align:left;"| @ New York Rangers (2003–04) ||12–6–5–2|| 31 || 
|-

|-  style="text-align:center; background:#cfc;"
|26||W||December 2, 2003||5–4 || style="text-align:left;"|  New York Rangers (2003–04) ||13–6–5–2|| 33 || 
|-  style="text-align:center; background:#cfc;"
|27||W||December 4, 2003||6–0 || style="text-align:left;"| @ Boston Bruins (2003–04) ||14–6–5–2|| 35 || 
|-  style="text-align:center; background:#cfc;"
|28||W||December 6, 2003||5–2 || style="text-align:left;"|  Detroit Red Wings (2003–04) ||15–6–5–2|| 37 || 
|-  style="text-align:center; background:#ffc;"
|29||OTL||December 9, 2003||2–3 OT|| style="text-align:left;"|  St. Louis Blues (2003–04) ||15–6–5–3|| 38 || 
|-  style="text-align:center; background:#cfc;"
|30||W||December 11, 2003||1–0 || style="text-align:left;"| @ Minnesota Wild (2003–04) ||16–6–5–3|| 40 || 
|-  style="text-align:center; background:#cfc;"
|31||W||December 13, 2003||3–1 || style="text-align:left;"|  New York Rangers (2003–04) ||17–6–5–3|| 42 || 
|-  style="text-align:center; background:#cfc;"
|32||W||December 16, 2003||3–0 || style="text-align:left;"|  Tampa Bay Lightning (2003–04) ||18–6–5–3|| 44 || 
|- style="text-align:center;"
|33||T||December 19, 2003||2–2 OT|| style="text-align:left;"| @ Washington Capitals (2003–04) ||18–6–6–3|| 45 || 
|-  style="text-align:center; background:#cfc;"
|34||W||December 20, 2003||4–2 || style="text-align:left;"|  Montreal Canadiens (2003–04) ||19–6–6–3|| 47 || 
|-  style="text-align:center; background:#cfc;"
|35||W||December 23, 2003||5–2 || style="text-align:left;"|  Florida Panthers (2003–04) ||20–6–6–3|| 49 || 
|-  style="text-align:center; background:#cfc;"
|36||W||December 26, 2003||6–5 OT|| style="text-align:left;"| @ New York Rangers (2003–04) ||21–6–6–3|| 51 || 
|-  style="text-align:center; background:#fbb;"
|37||L||December 27, 2003||1–3 || style="text-align:left;"| @ New York Islanders (2003–04) ||21–7–6–3|| 51 || 
|- style="text-align:center;"
|38||T||December 29, 2003||4–4 OT|| style="text-align:left;"| @ Florida Panthers (2003–04) ||21–7–7–3|| 52 || 
|-

|-  style="text-align:center; background:#fbb;"
|39||L||January 1, 2004||2–3 || style="text-align:left;"| @ Boston Bruins (2003–04) ||21–8–7–3|| 52 || 
|- style="text-align:center;"
|40||T||January 3, 2004||3–3 OT|| style="text-align:left;"|  Buffalo Sabres (2003–04) ||21–8–8–3|| 53 || 
|-  style="text-align:center; background:#cfc;"
|41||W||January 5, 2004||5–0 || style="text-align:left;"| @ Pittsburgh Penguins (2003–04) ||22–8–8–3|| 55 || 
|-  style="text-align:center; background:#cfc;"
|42||W||January 6, 2004||2–1 || style="text-align:left;"|  Nashville Predators (2003–04) ||23–8–8–3|| 57 || 
|-  style="text-align:center; background:#fbb;"
|43||L||January 8, 2004||1–7 || style="text-align:left;"|  Ottawa Senators (2003–04) ||23–9–8–3|| 57 || 
|-  style="text-align:center; background:#fbb;"
|44||L||January 10, 2004||0–1 || style="text-align:left;"|  New Jersey Devils (2003–04) ||23–10–8–3|| 57 || 
|-  style="text-align:center; background:#cfc;"
|45||W||January 13, 2004||4–1 || style="text-align:left;"|  Calgary Flames (2003–04) ||24–10–8–3|| 59 || 
|-  style="text-align:center; background:#fbb;"
|46||L||January 16, 2004||1–4 || style="text-align:left;"| @ Philadelphia Flyers (2003–04) ||24–11–8–3|| 59 || 
|-  style="text-align:center; background:#fbb;"
|47||L||January 17, 2004||0–4 || style="text-align:left;"|  Philadelphia Flyers (2003–04) ||24–12–8–3|| 59 || 
|-  style="text-align:center; background:#cfc;"
|48||W||January 20, 2004||2–0 || style="text-align:left;"|  New York Islanders (2003–04) ||25–12–8–3|| 61 || 
|-  style="text-align:center; background:#cfc;"
|49||W||January 21, 2004||3–2 || style="text-align:left;"| @ Washington Capitals (2003–04) ||26–12–8–3|| 63 || 
|-  style="text-align:center; background:#cfc;"
|50||W||January 24, 2004||4–1 || style="text-align:left;"| @ Montreal Canadiens (2003–04) ||27–12–8–3|| 65 || 
|-  style="text-align:center; background:#fbb;"
|51||L||January 27, 2004||0–2 || style="text-align:left;"|  Carolina Hurricanes (2003–04) ||27–13–8–3|| 65 || 
|-  style="text-align:center; background:#cfc;"
|52||W||January 30, 2004||4–1 || style="text-align:left;"| @ Atlanta Thrashers (2003–04) ||28–13–8–3|| 67 || 
|-  style="text-align:center; background:#cfc;"
|53||W||January 31, 2004||5–1 || style="text-align:left;"|  Ottawa Senators (2003–04) ||29–13–8–3|| 69 || 
|-

|-  style="text-align:center; background:#fbb;"
|54||L||February 3, 2004||1–4 || style="text-align:left;"|  Chicago Blackhawks (2003–04) ||29–14–8–3|| 69 || 
|-  style="text-align:center; background:#cfc;"
|55||W||February 5, 2004||5–4 OT|| style="text-align:left;"| @ Ottawa Senators (2003–04) ||30–14–8–3|| 71 || 
|- style="text-align:center;"
|56||T||February 10, 2004||4–4 OT|| style="text-align:left;"| @ Tampa Bay Lightning (2003–04) ||30–14–9–3|| 72 || 
|-  style="text-align:center; background:#cfc;"
|57||W||February 12, 2004||4–1 || style="text-align:left;"|  Columbus Blue Jackets (2003–04) ||31–14–9–3|| 74 || 
|-  style="text-align:center; background:#fbb;"
|58||L||February 14, 2004||4–6 || style="text-align:left;"|  Buffalo Sabres (2003–04) ||31–15–9–3|| 74 || 
|-  style="text-align:center; background:#cfc;"
|59||W||February 16, 2004||8–4 || style="text-align:left;"| @ Pittsburgh Penguins (2003–04) ||32–15–9–3|| 76 || 
|-  style="text-align:center; background:#fbb;"
|60||L||February 17, 2004||2–5 || style="text-align:left;"|  Boston Bruins (2003–04) ||32–16–9–3|| 76 || 
|-  style="text-align:center; background:#cfc;"
|61||W||February 19, 2004||2–1 OT|| style="text-align:left;"| @ Carolina Hurricanes (2003–04) ||33–16–9–3|| 78 || 
|-  style="text-align:center; background:#cfc;"
|62||W||February 21, 2004||5–4 || style="text-align:left;"|  Montreal Canadiens (2003–04) ||34–16–9–3|| 80 || 
|-  style="text-align:center; background:#fbb;"
|63||L||February 23, 2004||1–2 || style="text-align:left;"|  Carolina Hurricanes (2003–04) ||34–17–9–3|| 80 || 
|-  style="text-align:center; background:#fbb;"
|64||L||February 25, 2004||0–4 || style="text-align:left;"| @ Florida Panthers (2003–04) ||34–18–9–3|| 80 || 
|-  style="text-align:center; background:#fbb;"
|65||L||February 26, 2004||3–4 || style="text-align:left;"| @ Tampa Bay Lightning (2003–04) ||34–19–9–3|| 80 || 
|-  style="text-align:center; background:#cfc;"
|66||W||February 28, 2004||3–0 || style="text-align:left;"|  New Jersey Devils (2003–04) ||35–19–9–3|| 82 || 
|-

|-  style="text-align:center; background:#cfc;"
|67||W||March 2, 2004||3–2 || style="text-align:left;"|  Boston Bruins (2003–04) ||36–19–9–3|| 84 || 
|-  style="text-align:center; background:#cfc;"
|68||W||March 4, 2004||6–2 || style="text-align:left;"|  New York Islanders (2003–04) ||37–19–9–3|| 86 || 
|-  style="text-align:center; background:#fbb;"
|69||L||March 6, 2004||1–5 || style="text-align:left;"|  Buffalo Sabres (2003–04) ||37–20–9–3|| 86 || 
|-  style="text-align:center; background:#cfc;"
|70||W||March 9, 2004||5–0 || style="text-align:left;"|  Florida Panthers (2003–04) ||38–20–9–3|| 88 || 
|-  style="text-align:center; background:#fbb;"
|71||L||March 11, 2004||2–3 || style="text-align:left;"|  Pittsburgh Penguins (2003–04) ||38–21–9–3|| 88 || 
|-  style="text-align:center; background:#fbb;"
|72||L||March 13, 2004||3–4 || style="text-align:left;"| @ Montreal Canadiens (2003–04) ||38–22–9–3|| 88 || 
|-  style="text-align:center; background:#cfc;"
|73||W||March 15, 2004||6–5 OT|| style="text-align:left;"| @ Buffalo Sabres (2003–04) ||39–22–9–3|| 90 || 
|-  style="text-align:center; background:#fbb;"
|74||L||March 16, 2004||1–2 || style="text-align:left;"|  Boston Bruins (2003–04) ||39–23–9–3|| 90 || 
|-  style="text-align:center; background:#cfc;"
|75||W||March 18, 2004||3–2 || style="text-align:left;"| @ Philadelphia Flyers (2003–04) ||40–23–9–3|| 92 || 
|-  style="text-align:center; background:#cfc;"
|76||W||March 20, 2004||5–2 || style="text-align:left;"|  Colorado Avalanche (2003–04) ||41–23–9–3|| 94 || 
|-  style="text-align:center; background:#fbb;"
|77||L||March 23, 2004||2–7 || style="text-align:left;"|  Tampa Bay Lightning (2003–04) ||41–24–9–3|| 94 || 
|-  style="text-align:center; background:#cfc;"
|78||W||March 25, 2004||3–0 || style="text-align:left;"| @ Boston Bruins (2003–04) ||42–24–9–3|| 96 || 
|- style="text-align:center;"
|79||T||March 27, 2004||2–2 OT|| style="text-align:left;"|  Ottawa Senators (2003–04) ||42–24–10–3|| 97 || 
|-  style="text-align:center; background:#cfc;"
|80||W||March 29, 2004||4–2 || style="text-align:left;"|  Atlanta Thrashers (2003–04) ||43–24–10–3|| 99 || 
|-

|-  style="text-align:center; background:#cfc;"
|81||W||April 2, 2004||2–0 || style="text-align:left;"| @ Buffalo Sabres (2003–04) ||44–24–10–3|| 101 || 
|-  style="text-align:center; background:#cfc;"
|82||W||April 3, 2004||6–0 || style="text-align:left;"| @ Ottawa Senators (2003–04) ||45–24–10–3|| 103 || 
|-

|-
| Legend:

 † Hockey Hall of Fame Game

Playoffs

|- style="text-align:center; background:#fbb;"
|1|| April 8 || Ottawa || 4–2 || Toronto || || 19,535 || Senators lead 1–0 || 
|- style="text-align:center; background:#cfc;"
|2|| April 10 || Ottawa || 0–2 ||  Toronto || || 19,529 || Series tied 1–1 || 
|- style="text-align:center; background:#cfc;"
|3|| April 12 || Toronto || 2–0 || Ottawa || || 18,500 || Maple Leafs lead 2–1 || 
|- style="text-align:center; background:#fbb;"
|4|| April 14 || Toronto || 1–4 ||  Ottawa || || 18,500 || Series tied 2–2 || 
|- style="text-align:center; background:#cfc;"
|5|| April 16 || Ottawa || 0–2 || Toronto || || 19,584 || Maple Leafs lead 3–2 || 
|- style="text-align:center; background:#fbb;"
|6|| April 18 || Toronto || 1–2 ||  Ottawa || 2OT || 18,500 || Series tied 3–3 || 
|- style="text-align:center; background:#cfc;"
|7|| April 20 || Ottawa || 1–4 || Toronto || || 19,646 || Maple Leafs win 4–3 || 
|-

|- style="text-align:center; background:#fbb;"
| 1 || April 22 || Toronto || 3–1 || Philadelphia || || 19,447 || Flyers lead 1–0 || 
|- style="text-align:center; background:#fbb;"
| 2 || April 25 || Toronto || 2–1 || Philadelphia || || 19,792 || Flyers lead 2–0 || 
|- style="text-align:center; background:#cfc;"
| 3 || April 28 || Philadelphia || 1–4 || Toronto || || 19,628 || Flyers lead 2–1 || 
|- style="text-align:center; background:#cfc;"
| 4 || April 30 || Philadelphia || 1–3 || Toronto || || 19,614 || Series tied 2–2 || 
|- style="text-align:center; background:#fbb;"
| 5 || May 2 || Toronto || 7–2 || Philadelphia || || 19,825 || Flyers lead 3–2 || 
|- style="text-align:center; background:#fbb;"
| 6 || May 4 || Philadelphia || 3–2 || Toronto || OT || 19,625 || Flyers win 4–2 || 
|-

|-
| Legend:

Player statistics

Scoring
 Position abbreviations: C = Centre; D = Defence; G = Goaltender; LW = Left Wing; RW = Right Wing
  = Joined team via a transaction (e.g., trade, waivers, signing) during the season. Stats reflect time with the Maple Leafs only.
  = Left team via a transaction (e.g., trade, waivers, release) during the season. Stats reflect time with the Maple Leafs only.

Goaltending

Awards and records

Awards

Milestones

Transactions
The Maple Leafs were involved in the following transactions from June 10, 2003, the day after the deciding game of the 2003 Stanley Cup Finals, through June 7, 2004, the day of the deciding game of the 2004 Stanley Cup Finals.

Trades

Players acquired

Players lost

Signings

Draft picks
Toronto's draft picks at the 2003 NHL Entry Draft held at the Gaylord Entertainment Center in Nashville, Tennessee.

Farm teams
St. John's Maple Leafs (AHL)
Memphis RiverKings (CHL)

See also
 2003–04 NHL season

Notes

References

 
 

Toronto Maple Leafs season, 2003-04
Toronto Maple Leafs seasons
Toronto